Marnal (Maranal) is a panchayat village in Shorapur taluka of Yadgir district in Karnataka state, India. Marnal is 4 km southwest of Bardevanhal. The nearest railhead is in Yadgir.

There are six villages in the Marnal gram panchayat: Marnal, Bassapur, Kamalpur, Mailapur, Mudilinganhal, and Yenniwadgera.

Demographics 
 census, Marnal had 1,137 inhabitants, with 559 males and 578 females.

Notes

External links 
 

Villages in Yadgir district